The Panthic Party was a political party in India in the 1940s that focused on the Sikhs. Sardar Swaran Singh and Baldev Singh were prominent members of this party, both of which later joined Indian National Congress and rose to the status of cabinet minister in the Union Government of India.

References 

Defunct political parties in India
Sikh political parties
Political parties established in the 1940s
1940s establishments in India
Political parties with year of disestablishment missing